The 2015 Red Bull MotoGP Rookies Cup was the ninth season of the Red Bull MotoGP Rookies Cup. After the selection event held from 14 to 16 October 2014 at Circuito Guadix in Spain and pre-season testing, held in April 2015 in Aragon, the season began at Jerez on 2 May and ended on 27 September at the Ciudad del Motor de Aragón after 13 races. The races, for the third year contested by the riders on equal KTM 250cc 4-stroke Moto3 bikes, were held at seven meetings on the Grand Prix motorcycle racing calendar.

Dutch rider Bo Bendsneyder won the championship, securing the title after the Misano race. Bendsneyder started the season with five successive victories, establishing a healthy championship lead. Ultimately, Bendsneyder won eight races during the season, and only finished off the podium on three occasions. Bendsneyder won the championship by 49 points ahead of Italy's Fabio Di Giannantonio, who was a three-time race winner at the Sachsenring, Brno and Aragon. Third place in the championship was decided in the final Aragon race between Silverstone winner Ayumu Sasaki, Marc García – who won the weekend's opening race – and Óscar Gutiérrez. Sasaki finished second to Di Giannantonio in the race to seal third in the championship, while García's fifth place to an eighth place for Gutiérrez ensured fourth in the final standings.

Calendar

Entry list

Championship standings
Points were awarded to the top fifteen riders, provided the rider finished the race.

References

External links
 

Red Bull MotoGP Rookies Cup
Red Bull MotoGP Rookies Cup racing seasons